In functional analysis, the Krein–Rutman theorem is a generalisation of the Perron–Frobenius theorem to infinite-dimensional Banach spaces. It was proved by Krein and Rutman in 1948.

Statement

Let  be a non-zero compact operator which is positive, meaning that , and assume that its spectral radius  is strictly positive.

De Pagter's theorem

If the positive operator  is assumed  to be ideal irreducible, namely, 
there is no ideal  of  such that , then de Pagter's theorem asserts that .

Therefore, for ideal irreducible operators the assumption  is not needed.

References 

Spectral theory
Theorems in functional analysis